Rasbora volzii is a species of ray-finned fish in the genus Rasbora, from Sarawak and West Kalimantan on Borneo.

References

Rasboras
Freshwater fish of Borneo
Freshwater fish of Malaysia
Fish described in 1905
Taxa named by Canna Maria Louise Popta